Aussie is Australian slang for Australian, both the adjective and the noun.

Aussie may also refer to:

Aussie (financial group), an Australian retail financial services group
Aussie (shampoo), a brand of shampoo
Aussie (trimaran), a day-racing sailboat designed by Ray Kendrick
Aussie: The Australian Soldiers' Magazine, a World War I publication
Aussie Stadium, a football stadium in Sydney, Australia
Australian dollar
Australian Shepherd, a breed of dog
Australian Surf Life Saving Championships or The Aussies
Aussie, an Inflatable Rescue Boat (IRB) Racing award